The United Arab Emirates has an embassy in Beirut, and Lebanon maintains an embassy in Abu Dhabi and a consulate-general in Dubai. Both countries are part of the Middle East region and share close cultural ties. There are hundreds of thousands of Lebanese expatriates living and working in the U.A.E.

References

 
United Arab Emirates
Bilateral relations of the United Arab Emirates